4I or 4-I may refer to:

Izair's IATA code
Nimiq 4i, a model of Nimiq

See also
I4 (disambiguation)